The Connect: Dejavu is the sixth extended play by the South Korean boy group Monsta X. It was released by Starship Entertainment and distributed by Kakao M on March 26, 2018. It also consists of seven tracks, including the lead single "Jealousy".

Background and release 
In March, Monsta X released the scheduler through the official SNS channel, with the released image in a dreamy color, while having a background of Hyungwon holding a camera and staring at something, sensual typography and part of the seven logos are shown.

The EP was released with a total of four different versions (I / II / III / IV).

Critical reception
"Jealousy" was praised for its fresh sound as "a poppy dance track swelling with obnoxious synths and their favorite low brasses", supposed as noted by Taylor Glasby of Dazed, it returned to more of Monsta X's earlier style of "heavy EDM and trap singles" than their last single "Dramarama".

Listicles

Commercial performance
As of 2022, the album has sold 195,762 copies in South Korea. The album charted at number 2 on the weekly Gaon Album Chart, and charted at number 28 overall in 2018.

"Jealousy" had one music show win on The Show on April 17.

Track listing

Charts

Album

Weekly charts

Monthly chart

Year-end chart

Song

Weekly charts

Certification and sales

Accolades

Awards and nominations

Release history

See also
 List of K-pop songs on the Billboard charts
 List of K-pop albums on the Billboard charts
 List of K-pop songs on the World Digital Song Sales chart

Notes

References

2018 EPs
Korean-language EPs
Kakao M EPs
Monsta X EPs
Starship Entertainment EPs